Forever is a studio album by Slim Whitman, released in 1962 on Imperial Records.

Track listing 
The album was issued in the United States by Imperial as a 12-inch long-playing record, catalog numbers LP 9171 (mono) and LP 12171 (stereo).

References 

1962 albums
Slim Whitman albums
Imperial Records albums